Richard Robbins (born 30 March 1940) is a Distinguished Teaching Professor of anthropology at the State University of New York at Plattsburgh.

Education
He received a Bachelor of Arts in Psychology from Rutgers University, a Master of Arts in Anthropology from New York University, and a Ph.D in Anthropology from the University of North Carolina, Chapel Hill.

Awards and honors
 2005: American Anthropological Association AAA/McGraw-Hill Teacher of the Year Award
 2002: SUNY Distinguished Teaching Professor
 1977: SUNY Chancellor's Award for Excellence in Teaching

Selected publications
 2012: Cultural Anthropology: A Problem Based Approach (6th edition), Cengage Publishers
 2012: Neoliberalism, Race and Racism. In: Encyclopedia of Race and Racism, 2nd edition. Edited by Patrick Mason. Cengage Publishers
 2009: Anthropologizing Economics: Lessons from the Latest Crisis, Anthropology News, 50:11-12
 2009: Darwin and the Bible: The Cultural Confrontation. Edited (with Mark Nathan Cohen). Allyn & Bacon Publishers
 2005: Global Problems and the Culture of Capitalism (3rd Edition), Allyn & Bacon, Publishers, Boston, Mass.  
 2005: The History of Technology: The Western Tradition. In: Sal Restivo (Eds.): The Oxford Encyclopedia of Science, Technology and Society, Oxford University Press
 1999: Ethnic Violence and the Question of Political Sovereignty. In: Richard Deutsch (Eds:) Perspectives Anthropology, Coursewise Publishing Inc., St. Paul, MN
 1988: The Belief Machine. Published on the web at https://web.archive.org/web/20130819082116/http://faculty.plattsburgh.edu/richard.robbins/belief/belief-machine.htm
 1975: Canadian Native Peoples: A Review, The American Review of Canadian Studies, Volume 1, #5
 1969: Economic Change and Ecological Adaptation among the Schefferville Naskapi.  McGill Subarctic Research Laboratory Reports, Volume 4

Online
 1996–present: Global Problems and the Culture of Capitalism, A multi-purpose site that includes, among other things, course material, an Internet course, support materials for the Global Problems and the Culture of Capitalism, a "global update" feature, and an extensive collection of links to Internet resources on global issues.

References

External links
 Faculty Page, SUNY at Plattsburgh

1940 births
Living people
American anthropologists
State University of New York at Plattsburgh faculty
State University of New York faculty
Writers about globalization
Rutgers University alumni
New York University alumni